John Hepburn (died between 27 March and 22 May 1557) was provided bishop of Brechin, Scotland, by Pope Leo X on 29 October 1516, but there may have been a delay in consecrating him due to his "defect of age". He may not have been consecrated until sometime between June 1522 and 23 February 1523, though the evidence is complex and contradictory.

He was one of the younger sons of Sir Patrick Hepburn, 1st Earl of Bothwell by his spouse Margaret, daughter of George Gordon, 2nd Earl of Huntly, whose marriage contract was signed on 21 February 1491, indicating a probable year of birth for John as circa 1500.

Bishop Hepburn's first recorded appearance in parliament appears on 16 November 1524, occurring thereafter with great regularity. He died on the eve of the Scottish Reformation having served four decades in office.

Notes

References

 
 

1557 deaths
Bishops of Brechin (pre-Reformation)
Year of birth unknown
People from East Lothian
16th-century Scottish Roman Catholic bishops
Younger sons of earls